is a Buddhist temple of the Sōtō Zen sect in Sakyō-ku, Kyoto, Japan. It is registered as a historic site of Japan. It stands on the grounds of its founder, the Edo period intellectual Ishikawa Jōzan (1583–1672), who established the temple in 1641.

A room in the main temple displays portraits of thirty-six Chinese poets. The selection of the poets was based on the opinion of Hayashi Razan. The portraits were executed by Kanō Tan'yū. This and some other parts of the building date to the time of Ishikawa Jōzan.

The temple's gardens are considered masterworks of Japanese gardens. One of them includes a device called a sōzu, a type of shishi-odoshi designed to scare away wild animals such as deer by making a loud noise. Water trickles into a bamboo tube, and when it reaches a certain level, it upsets the balance of the tube. The tube tips over on a pivot, discharging the water, and turns upright, striking a rock and emitting a loud clapping noise.  plays a recording of the sōzu at Shisen-dō.

See also 
 For an explanation of terms concerning Japanese Buddhism, Japanese Buddhist art, and Japanese Buddhist temple architecture, see the Glossary of Japanese Buddhism.

References

Sources
This article incorporates material translated from 詩仙堂 (Shisen-dō) in the Japanese Wikipedia, retrieved on January 10, 2009.

External links
 Shisen-dō Homepage
 Photos of Shisen-dō

1641 establishments in Japan
Buddhist temples in Kyoto
Soto temples
Historic Sites of Japan